Leslie Charles Coleman  (16 June 1878 – 14 September 1954) was a Canadian entomologist, plant pathologist and virologist who worked as the first director of agriculture in Mysore State in southern India. He conducted pioneering research on the pests and diseases affecting agriculture in the region and was instrumental in establishing several agricultural research and educational institutions including the Hebbal Agricultural School which later became a part of the University of Agricultural Sciences, Bangalore and the Central Coffee Research Institute at Balehonnur. His major contributions to plant protection included measures to control a rot disease of coffee caused by Pellicularia koleroga (now Ceratobasidium noxium) known in southern India as koleroga. Coleman established measures for koleroga, a generic name for rot-causing diseases in Kannada, that caused complete destruction in areca plantations. Sprays of inexpensive Bordeaux mixture on the growing crowns helped control infection caused by what he described as Phytophthora arecae (now considered as Phytophthora palmivora).

Early life 

Leslie Coleman was born in Durham County, Ontario, Canada, on 16 June 1878 to Elizabeth and Francis T. Coleman. He had three brothers and two sisters. The family appears to have moved between Toronto and Spokane, Washington as Coleman went to the Arthur High School and Harbord Collegiate Institute after which Leslie became a primary school teacher (following his brother Norman Frank Coleman who became a President of Reed College while another brother Herbert was principal of Spokane High School). In 1900 he joined the University of Toronto and graduated in science with a Governor General's Gold medal in 1904. Coleman spent the summer of 1904 at the marine research stations at Malpeque and at Georgian Bay where he studied oyster cultivation. He received the Frederick Wyld Prize for English Essay in 1905. He moved to Germany for further study and obtained a doctorate from the University of Göttingen. Here he studied nitrification by soil bacteria. He trained in mycology under Heinrich Klebahn. From 1906, he worked at the Kaiser Wilhelm Institute for Agriculture and Forestry in Berlin for two years before he obtained a five-year appointment as Mycologist and Entomologist in the State of Mysore in India in 1908.

India 

Coleman joined as an entomologist in the agricultural research establishment begun in the State of Mysore by Adolf Lehmann, a Canadian chemist of German descent. Lehmann's appointment as a chemist had followed from the recommendations of a committee headed by Dr J.A. Voelcker to improve agriculture in India and while his focus had been on soil fertility he found the need for plant protection expert. After the retirement of Lehmann, Coleman headed the Chemistry department of the Mysore Agricultural Department while also studying crop pests and diseases. He was appointed as the Director of Agriculture in 1913 and held the position until 1934 with a break between 1925 and 1928.

Coleman was also involved in the establishment of the Hebbal Agricultural School in July 1913 (serving as its founding principal) and three vernacular agricultural schools were started at Chikkanhalli, Hassan, and Ramakrishnapur. The school at Hebbal later became the Agricultural College at Hebbal in Bangalore (on 14 June 1946) and in 1964 became a part of the University of Agricultural Sciences, Bangalore. Another innovation was the establishment of the Mysore Agricultural and Experimental Union in 1918, consisting of land owning cultivators interested in carrying out experiments and scientific investigations on new methods, conduct manure and crop trials just like the government experimental farms while also popularising new ideas among farmers. At the 1912 Dasara exhibition in Mysore, he organized an exhibit of insect pests and measures for their management.  A field day was held once a year in November. The Union was based on a similar idea in Ontario and published a quarterly journal in English (Journal of the Mysore Agricultural Experimental Union now called the Mysore Journal of Agricultural Sciences) and a Kannada monthly. In 1918, Coleman spoke at the Mysore Economic Conference on the Japanese approach to consolidation of small farmer holdings to reduce wastage of land for boundaries and noted that such an idea would be difficult to implement in India due to the Hindu laws of inheritance. From January 1919 to July, he taught biology to Canadian army personnel returning from the First World War in a makeshift training centre in Ripon, Yorkshire. This six month course at the Khaki University was accepted by Canadian universities as equal to a full year of coursework. Coleman reflected on his experience in education in this setup in a Mysore University publication noting how the lack of a proper building hardly affected the aim of providing education. 

From the 1920s Coleman was increasingly responsible for administration with the department of sericulture (but moved back under the director of industries and commerce in 1923) and the Civil Veterinary and Amrut Mahal Departments placed under the care of his department. Coleman helped establish a number of new institutions including the Central Coffee Research Institute at Balehonnur in 1925 with an original eighteen acres of coffee land leased out by C.S. Crawford. Coleman's research in the 1930s included studies on coffee rust, Hemileia vastatrix, and a disease of areca caused by Phytophthora palmivora (then called P. arecae). He also studied a mycoplasma infection that affected sandal and caused sandal spike. As a research administrator Coleman recruited and mentored the Indian entomologist K. Kunhikannan and the mycologist M. J. Narasimhan who worked as assistants. In 1921 and 1933 he introduced Agromyzid flies (Ophiomyia lantanae) from Hawaii for the control of Lantana. 

Coleman suggested experiments on X-ray induced mutation for breeding new sugarcane varieties based on observations of similar attempts on Tobacco at the Klaten Experimental Station in Java. These mutation experiments were then conducted by Venkatrao K. Badami.  Coleman was involved in the passing of the Diseases and Pests Act (1917), the first attempt in India to manage pests through legislation and was aimed at control of the white stem borer in coffee, a major export commodity from Mysore. The act made it compulsory for planters to take measures to control coffee stem-borer. Mass campaigns involving school children to collect hairy caterpillars for control were also novel. Coleman helped introduce improved agricultural equipment including the Holder knapsack sprayer and the Kolar mission plough imported from the United States by the Kolar Mission Institute and later modified and locally produced as the "Mysore plough".

Coleman also examined economic policies and was an advisor to many government bodies both in Mysore State and on deputation to the government of British India. In 1933, Mysore Sugar Company (or Mysugar), the first joint-stock private company in India with the government as a majority shareholder was established to process sugar at the Mysore Sugar Factory (begun 15 January 1934) produced by sugarcane farmers in the (then called the Irwin canal, now Visveshwariah) canal irrigated region of Mandya. The farmers were contracted to sell all their produce through what was then a novel "oppige" (Kannada for agreement or contract, making it among the oldest examples of industrial "contract farming") system. The first laboratory for breeding parasites to help control sugarcane stem borer was established in 1935-36 at Mandya following research begun in 1933.As a member of the board of agriculture in India, Coleman headed various advisory committees and was responsible for approving the establishment of a dedicated statistical unit at the Imperial Agricultural Research Institute.

A grasshopper genus, Colemania and another species Parahieroglyphus colemani were named after him by Ignacio Bolívar. Coleman made an extensive study of Colemania sphenarioides, a pest in some regions that affected sorghum. The scale insect Coccus colemani found on coffee was named after him by his assistant entomologist Kunhi Kannan in 1918. Coleman was interested in the role of natural parasites and predators for the control of pests. He took up measures to control Opuntia in Kolar district that included manual removal, their conversion of into green manure, and the use of cochineal insects in their control. He reared and studied many species of parasites. Telenomus colemani, Anastatus colemani, and Tetrastichus colemani are named after him.

Return to Canada 
In 1925 Coleman briefly returned to Canada due to ill health to take up a position in the Toronto University department of botany. In 1927 a part-time position of plant pathologist in Ontario was created. He worked briefly on the dead arm of grapes caused by Cryptosporella viticola. Coleman did not continue for long and resigned to return to India. In 1929 he published a report on the work done in Mysore and how it compared with the recommendations made by the Royal Commission on Agriculture in India. Coleman was made Companion of the Order of the Indian Empire in 1931. Working again for a few years in Mysore, Coleman retired from his position as Director of Agriculture in 1934 and left India to work at Toronto University, teaching and researching genetics. He worked on the cytology of Gasteria and Allium in 1936. In 1948 he studied the cytology of a grasshopper. 

Coleman was married twice. His first wife Mary MacDonald Urquhart (born Oct 19, 1882) died on May 10, 1918 in the Biligirirangan Hills from diabetes and was buried in the Honnametti estate of R.C. Morris. They had a son John Urquhart Coleman. Coleman married Phebe Ropes (born 1890), daughter of Willis H. Ropes of Danvers, Massachusetts, an artist trained in Boston, on 23 May 1923. They had two daughters and a son, also Leslie (1926-2019), who became a professor of geology at the University of Saskatchewan. Towards the end of 1953 Coleman visited Karnataka privately, but on hearing about his visit, the then chief minister Kengal Hanumanthaiah declared him a state guest and organized a tour of Karnataka to examine the state of agriculture and to visit the places where he had worked. Shortly after returning to Canada in 1954, while driving to his lab in Saanichton through dense fog, his car hit a culvert and he was killed.

References

External links 
 Rooting around for history
 VIP for a day
 Biographical sketch video

Canadian virologists
Canadian entomologists
1878 births
1954 deaths
Scientists from Ontario
University of Toronto alumni
Expatriates of Canada in British India
University of Göttingen alumni
Agricultural researchers in India